Witch is an American stoner metal band whose members are from Vermont and Massachusetts.

History 
Witch was formed in 2005 by Dinosaur Jr. guitarist J Mascis and long time friend Dave Sweetapple. However, Mascis does not play guitar for the band; he plays his first instrument, the drums. To complete the band's line-up, Mascis and Sweetapple recruited the guitarist and vocalist, Kyle Thomas, from King Tuff and avant-folk group Feathers. Their eponymous debut album was released on March 7, 2006. They also contributed an alternate version of the song "Rip Van Winkle" to the Invaders compilation, which was released by Kemado Records later that year. Their latest album Paralyzed was released on March 18, 2008.

Style 
Witch's trademark sound (particularly in their early work) shows obvious Black Sabbath influence. Black Flag influence was also noted for their sophomore effort, Paralyzed.

Band members 
Kyle Thomas – vocals, guitar
Graham Clise – guitar
Dave Sweetapple – bass
J Mascis – drums

Discography

Albums 
2006 – Witch – Tee Pee Records
2008 – Paralyzed – Tee Pee Records

Singles 
2006 – "Soul of Fire"/"Rip Van Winkle (Demo)" 7-inch – Tee Pee Records
2008 – Witch/Earthless split 7-inch – Volcom Entertainment Vinyl Club

DVD 
2007 – Local Band Nitemare – Blueberry Honey/Tee Pee Records (reissue)

External links 
Witch at Tee Pee Records

American stoner rock musical groups
American doom metal musical groups
Musical groups from Massachusetts
Heavy metal musical groups from Massachusetts
Musical groups established in 2005
Musical quartets